Garipçe is a village in Sarıyer district of  Istanbul Province, Turkey.

Garipçe is located on a hillside at the Black Sea entrance of Istanbul Strait, the northernmost place of Bosphorus' European shore, south of Rumelifeneri village. The village Poyrazköy in Beykoz district of Istanbul Province on the Asian shore of Bosphorus is just across Garipçe. It was declared as a protected area for its nature and seascape. The village became popular through the 2016-built Yavuz Sultan Selim Bridge spanning over Bosphorus between Garipçe and Poyrazköy.

A ruined historic fortress with tower built by Genoese some 550 years ago is situated on a hill south of the village.

Garipçe is a fishing community, popular for its fish restaurants. There is no lodging facility in the village.

Line #40 of the city bus İETT, running between Taksim Square and Rumelifeneri, serves Garipçe in the late night, and Line 150, running between Hacıosman Bayırı and Rumelifeneri, serves in the day.

References

Villages in Istanbul Province
Sarıyer
Populated coastal places in Turkey
Bosphorus
Tourist attractions in Istanbul Province
Fishing communities in Turkey
Restaurant districts and streets in Turkey